Jacek Krzysztof Chańko (born 25 January 1974) is a Polish former professional footballer who played as a defender.

Career
Chańko was born in Białystok, Poland.

In 1999, Chańko signed for Werder Bremen of the Bundesliga. In 2003, he stated that he regretted the move, because he did not play and could have signed for Legia Warsaw, the most successful club in Poland, where he could have been selected for the Poland national team. 

After that, Chańko signed for Pogoń Szczecin, where he claimed there were many unfulfilled agreements and promises.

References

External links
 
 

Living people
1974 births
Sportspeople from Białystok
Polish footballers
Poland international footballers
Association football midfielders
Association football defenders
Ekstraklasa players
Jagiellonia Białystok players
OKS Stomil Olsztyn players
SV Werder Bremen players
Pogoń Szczecin players
Widzew Łódź players